Gillen is a suburb of the town of Alice Springs in the Northern Territory, Australia.

The suburb is named after "FJ Gillen and Mt Gillen in the MacDonnell Ranges" and ultimately derived from the anthropologist Francis James Gillen, who was the telegraphist and station master at Alice Springs in 1892.

The suburb was named in April 2007, with the boundaries approved on 8 March 2007.

The Central Australian Aviation Museum is located within the suburb.

References

Suburbs of Alice Springs
Populated places established in 2007